Heather Wilde is an English actress who was active in stage and screen productions in both England and the United States between the late 1930s and 1950s. In films she was often cast in small uncredited roles. Wilde is perhaps best known today for her performances as a supporting character in two popular, critically acclaimed American comedies: as the primping little actress Miss Plupp in The Bank Dick (1940) starring W. C. Fields and as the anxious housemaid Annie in Life with Father (1947) starring William Powell and Irene Dunne.

Stage and film
In its December 8, 1940 issue, The Philadelphia Inquirer carries a news item that provides some background information on Wilde:

Selected filmography
The Divorce of Lady X (1938): Maid (uncredited)
The Bank Dick (1940): Miss Plupp
Confirm or Deny (1941): Telephone operator (uncredited)
Eagle Squadron (1942): WAAF member (uncredited)
Counter-Espionage (1942): Gertie Barrow (uncredited)
The Undying Monster (1942): Millie (uncredited)
Sherlock Holmes Faces Death (1943): Jenny (uncredited)
The Lodger (1944): Mary Bowles (uncredited)
Kitty (1945): Lil
The Imperfect Lady (1947): maid (uncredited)
Life with Father (1947): Annie
The Ghost and Mrs. Muir (1947): maid (uncredited)
The Lone Wolf in London (1947): maid (uncredited)
Fighter Squadron (1948): Corine (uncredited)
The Fighting O'Flynn (1949): barmaid (uncredited)
Last Holiday (1950): Maggie

References

External links

Living people
American film actresses
Year of birth missing (living people)
21st-century American women